Ola Røtvei (born 4 November 1953) is a Norwegian politician.

He was born in Oppdal to Inge Røtvei and Marta Ørstad. He was elected representative to the Storting for the period 1993–1997 for the Labour Party.

References

1953 births
Living people
People from Oppdal
Labour Party (Norway) politicians
Members of the Storting